Gabbiella stanleyi is a species of small freshwater snails with an operculum, aquatic prosobranch gastropod mollusks in the family Bithyniidae.

The specific name stanleyi is in honor of explorer Henry Morton Stanley.

This species is endemic to Lake Malawi.

References

Bithyniidae
Invertebrates of Malawi
Gastropods described in 1877
Taxonomy articles created by Polbot
Fauna of Lake Malawi